Stagea is a genus of cicadas in the family Cicadidae. There is at least one described species in Stagea, S. platyptera.

References

Further reading

 
 
 
 

Tettigomyiini
Cicadidae genera